Terror (French: Terreur) is a 1924 French silent drama film directed by Edward José and Gérard Bourgeois and starring Pearl White, Henri Baudin, and Arlette Marchal. It was the final film of the American actress White, known for her roles in serials such as The Perils of Pauline. It is sometimes known by the alternative title The Perils of Paris.

Plot
As described in a film magazine review, Helen Aldrich (Hélène Lorfeuil), a young American sculptress in Paris, has an unexpected adventure with a young Apache who visits her with the intention of obtaining her jewels, changes his mind, and agrees to pose for her. They fall in love. Professor Aldrich (Lorfeuil), her father, is the inventor of a death ray which is expected to accomplish great things in war. The secret is stolen and Helen's lover is suspected of the theft, so Helen sets out to prove his innocence. She does, after meeting with a variety of adventures, clearing the man she loves, and effecting the arrest of the gang leader.

Cast

References

Bibliography
 Rudmer Canjels. Distributing Silent Film Serials: Local Practices, Changing Forms, Cultural Transformation. Routledge, 2011.

External links

1924 films
Films directed by Edward José
Films directed by Gérard Bourgeois
French silent films
French black-and-white films
French drama films
1924 drama films
Silent drama films
1920s French films
1920s French-language films